Mayo-Louti is a department of North Province in Cameroon. The capital of the department is Guider.

Subdivisions
The department is divided administratively into 3 communes and in turn into villages.

Communes

 Figuil
 Guider
 Mayo-Oulo

References

Departments of Cameroon
North Region (Cameroon)